Dorena may refer to:

Dorena, Missouri, a community in the U.S. state of Missouri
Dorena, Oregon, a community in the U.S. state of Oregon